The year 2008 is the seventh year in the history of Cage Warriors, a mixed martial arts promotion based in the United Kingdom. In 2008 Cage Rage Championships held 4 events beginning with, Cage Warriors: USA Battle Royale.

Events list

Cage Warriors: USA Battle Royale

Cage Warriors: USA Battle Royale was an event held on March 29, 2008 in Kissimmee, United States.

Results

Cage Warriors: Enter the Rough House 6

Cage Warriors: Enter the Rough House 6 was an event held on April 19, 2008 in Nottingham, England.

Results

Cage Warriors: Enter the Rough House 7

Cage Warriors: Enter the Rough House 7 was an event held on July 12, 2008 in Nottingham, England.

Results

Cage Warriors: USA Unleashed

Cage Warriors: USA Unleashed was an event held on August 23, 2008 in Orlando, United States.

Results

See also 
 Cage Warriors

References

Cage Warriors events
2008 in mixed martial arts